Carminatia is a genus of annual plants in the family Asteraceae. They are native primarily to Mexico, but also the southwestern United States and Central America.

Description
These plants have erect stems which are unbranched or have few branches and grow 10 centimeters (4 inches) to well over 100 centimeters (40 inches) in height. The leaves are mostly opposite, but on the upper stem they may be alternately arranged. The cylindrical flower heads are just a few millimeters wide and are arranged in narrow or spikelike inflorescences. They contain 8 to 12 greenish or whitish disc florets. The fruit is a cypsela with a pappus of several plumelike bristles or scales.

 Species
 Carminatia alvarezii Rzed. & Calderón - San Luis Potosí, Querétaro, Puebla, Oaxaca, México State, Hidalgo
 Carminatia papagayana B.L.Turner - Guerrero
 Carminatia recondita McVaugh - Guatemala, El Salvador, Chiapas, Colima, Guerrero, Oaxaca, Jalisco,  México State, Michoacán, Morelos, Nayarit, Veracruz, Sinaloa, San Luis Potosí
 Carminatia tenuiflora DC. - Guatemala, El Salvador, most of Mexico, southern Arizona, southwestern New Mexico, western Texas

References

Eupatorieae
Asteraceae genera
Flora of North America